Herbig is a German surname. Notable people with the surname include:

George Herbig (born 1920), American astronomer
Günther Herbig (born 1931), German conductor
Michael Herbig (born 1968), German film director and actor
Nate Herbig (born 1994), American football player
Wilhelm Herbig (1788-1861), German painter

German-language surnames